Sixty Stories is a collection of sixty short stories written by Donald Barthelme, several of which originally appeared in The New Yorker. The book was first published by G. P. Putnam's Sons in 1981.

Stories
Sixty Stories includes works from the writer's first six short-story collections: Come Back, Dr. Caligari (1964), Unspeakable Practices, Unnatural Acts (1968),
City Life (1970), Sadness (1972), Amateurs (1976), and Great Days (1979). The full contents are as follows:

 Margins
 A Shower of Gold
 Me and Miss Mandible
 For I'm the Boy
 Will You Tell Me?
 The Balloon
 The President
 Game
 Alice
 Robert Kennedy Saved from Drowning
 Report
 The Dolt
 See the Moon?
 The Indian Uprising
 Views of My Father Weeping
 Paraguay
 On Angels
 The Phantom of the Opera's Friend
 City Life
 Kierkegaard Unfair to Schlegel
 The Falling Dog
 The Policemen's Ball
 The Glass Mountain
 Critique de la Vie Quotidienne
 The Sandman
 Traumerei
 The Rise of Capitalism
 A City of Churches
 Daumier
 The Party
 Eugenie Grandet
 Nothing: A Preliminary Account
 A Manual for Sons
 At the End of the Mechanical Age
 Rebecca
 The Captured Woman
 I Bought a Little City
 The Sergeant
 The School
 The Great Hug
 Our Work and Why We Do It
 The Crisis
 Cortes and Montezuma
 The New Music
 The Zombies
 The King of Jazz
 Morning
 The Death of Edward Lear
 The Abduction from the Seraglio
 On the Steps of the Conservatory
 The Leap
 Aria
 The Emerald
 How I Write My Songs
 The Farewell
 The Emperor
 Thailand
 Heroes
 Bishop
 Grandmother's House

Reception
The collection was received with great enthusiasm by critics. In The New York Times, critic Anatole Broyard wrote, "Donald Barthelme may have influenced the short story in his time as much as Hemingway or O'Hara did in theirs. They loosened the story's grip on the security of plot, but he broke it altogether and forced the form to live dangerously. O'Hara played with the brand names of our things, and Donald Barthelme plays with the brand names of our ideas. While Hemingway and O'Hara worked with specific feelings, he works with the structure of our emotional makeup. A Barthelme collection like 'Sixty Stories' is a Whole Earth Catalogue of life in our time." In The New York Times Book Review, critic John Romano called Barthelme a "comic genius," adding, "The will to please us, to make us sit up and laugh with surprise, is greater than the will to disconcert. The chief thing to say about Barthelme, beyond praise for his skill, which seems to me supererogatory, is that he is fiercely committed to showing us a good time, at least in the vast proportion of his work. The spirit is: Many things are silly, especially about modern language, and there is much sadness everywhere, but all is roughly well. So let's try and enjoy ourselves, as intelligently as possible...The point is that we are not finished needing, from marvelously gifted writers such as he, help with the vicissitudes of modern life."

Forty Stories
Forty Stories, a companion volume to Sixty Stories, was published six years later, in 1987.

References

External links
The New York Times Book Review on Sixty Stories
The New York Times on Sixty Stories

1981 short story collections
PEN/Faulkner Award for Fiction-winning works
Postmodern novels